The Batala Municipal Corporation is a nagar nigam (municipal corporation) which administers the city of Batala, Punjab. It has 50 members elected with a first-past-the-post voting system and 1 ex-officio member which is MLA for Batala. In 2019 Government of Punjab decided to upgrade Batala Municipal council into Municipal Corporation, earlier it was a municipal council.

Mayor
The Mayor of Batala is the elected chief of the Municipal Corporation of Batala. The mayor is the first citizen of the city. The role is largely ceremonial as the real powers are vested in the Municipal Commissioner. The mayor plays a decorative role of representing and upholding the dignity of the city and a functional role in deliberating over the discussions in the Corporation. In 2019 after upgradation into corporation, municipal commissioner Balwinder Singh was given additional charge of Mayor of Batala. After 1st election Sukhdeep Singh Teja elected the first Mayor.

Deputy Mayors
Senior Deputy Mayor

Junior Deputy Mayor

Municipal Commissioner
Every municipal corporation in India is administratively headed by a municipal commissioner. While a Mayor is elected to serve as the ceremonial head of a municipal corporation, a municipal commissioner is appointed by the state government from the Indian Administrative Service or Provincial Civil Service (PCS) to head the administrative staff of the municipal corporation, implement the decisions of the corporation, and prepare its annual budget.

Councilors
Following is the list of Incumbent  Councilors
Color Key for the Party of the Councilor
  Indian National Congress
  Shiromani Akali Dal 
  Bharatiya Janata Party
  Aam Aadmi Party
  Independent

Ex-Officio member
According to Section 5 (1) (ii) of the Punjab Municipal Corporation Act 1976 ex-officio members comprising the members of Punjab legislative assembly representing the constituencies in which the city or any part there of falls.

Thus the person who represents the Batala Assembly Constituency in the Punjab Legislative Assembly is the ex-officio member of corporation.

Ex-officio member has voting right on par with elected members during the election of Mayor or Deputy mayors in corporation. His vote becomes crucial when a single party lacks required numbers of votes to secure mayor's post or when parties get equal numbers of elected ward members.

Color key for the party of ex-officio member
  Shiromani Akali Dal 
  Aam Aadmi Party

List of ex-officio members

1st Election

Schedule

After the up gradation to Corporation the first election for all 50 wards was held on 14 February 2021 and result was declared on 17 February. Total 279 candidates stood for elections. The election programme was as follow:-

Result

Elected Councilors
Color Key for the Party of the Councilor
  Indian National Congress
  Shiromani Akali Dal 
  Bharatiya Janata Party
  Aam Aadmi Party
  Independent

See also
 2021 Punjab, India local elections
 Elections in Punjab

References

Municipal corporations in Punjab, India
2019 establishments in Punjab, India